The Al Anbat is an independent Arabic daily national newspaper, published in Jordan, and headquartered in Amman.

History and profile
Al Anbat was started in May 2005 as a 28-page daily political paper. The paper was founded by Riyadh Al Hroob and his wife, Rula Al Hroob. Riyadh is the publisher while Rula is the editor-in-chief of the paper.

Al Anbat is published in tabloid format. It was first daily in Jordan published with this format.

On 28 September 2005 the paper's information office was attacked by three masked people.

See also
List of newspapers in Jordan

References

External links
Al Anbat website

2005 establishments in Jordan
Newspapers established in 2005
Arabic-language newspapers
Newspapers published in Jordan
Mass media in Amman